Sergio Segura García (born 30 August 1995) is a Spanish footballer who plays for CF Pozuelo de Alarcón as a left back.

Club career
Segura was born in Villarreal, Castellón, Valencian Community, and was a CD Castellón youth graduate. In 2014 he joined CD Leganés, being initially assigned to the reserves in the regional leagues.

Segura made his first-team debut on 29 November 2016, starting in a 1–3 home loss against Valencia CF for the season's Copa del Rey.

References

External links
Leganés official profile 

1995 births
Living people
People from Villarreal
Sportspeople from the Province of Castellón
Spanish footballers
Footballers from the Valencian Community
Association football defenders
Segunda División B players
Tercera División players
Divisiones Regionales de Fútbol players
CD Leganés B players
CD Leganés players
CDA Navalcarnero players